Michał Marian Walicki (8 August 1904 in St. Petersburg – 22 August 1966 in Warsaw) was a Polish art historian and professor at the Warsaw University of Technology and School of Fine Arts (later Academy of Fine Arts in Warsaw).

Life and work
From 1924 to 1929, Walicki studied art history at the University of Warsaw, where he also wrote his PhD thesis. In 1934 he was appointed associate professor and in 1937 full professor of art history. He worked at the Department of Polish Architecture at the Warsaw Technical University, at the Warsaw School of Fine Arts (later the Academy of Fine Arts in Warsaw), at the National Museum, Warsaw, where he was curator of the Gallery of Foreign Painting, and at the Art History Institute of the University of Warsaw.

According to Juliusz Chrościcki, Walicki was a great art historian. He was a consummate connoisseur of seventeenth-century Dutch painting and Polish Gothic painting, and wrote, as author or co-author, many publications devoted to Polish and foreign painting. He also promoted the popularization of, and education through, art, as he could write about art in a manner accessible and understandable to all.

Walicki's most famous student was Jan Białostocki. In his younger years, the latter worked as an assistant to Walicki at the National Museum, Warsaw, and, as an unpaid assistant, also at the University of Warsaw in Walicki's Institute of Medieval Art History. In 1957, Walicki and Białostocki wrote an overview of the history of painting collecting in Poland.

References

Select publications
 (with Juliusz Starzyński), Dzieje sztuki polskiej (1934)
 Malarstwo polskie XV wieku (1938)
 Malarstwo obce w zbiorach polskich (1955)
 (with Jan Białostocki), Malarstwo polskie, Gotyk, renesans, wczesny manieryzm (1961)
 Obrazy dalekie i bliskie (1963)
 Złoty widnokrąg (1965)

Further reading
 Sztuka i historia; księga pamiątkowa ku czci Michała Walickiego (Art and history; A festschrift in honor of Michał Walicki). Warsaw: Wydawnictwa Artystyczne i Filmowe, 1966 (includes a bibliography of Walicki's works by Anna Wiercinska).

External links
 Marek Walczak, MICHAŁ WALICKI (1904–1966)
 Library of Congress: Visual arts in Poland

Polish art historians
Academic staff of the Warsaw University of Technology
1904 births
1966 deaths